Agononida polycerta is a species of squat lobster in the family Munididae. It can be found in French Polynesia.

References

Squat lobsters
Crustaceans described in 2014